Donald Johnson and Jared Palmer were the defending champions but lost in the final 0–6, 7–6(7–3), 6–4 against Mike Bryan and Mark Knowles.

Seeds

  Donald Johnson /  Jared Palmer (final)
  Mike Bryan /  Mark Knowles (champions)
  Ellis Ferreira /  Rick Leach (first round)
  Michaël Llodra /  Fabrice Santoro (first round)

Draw

External links
 2002 Nottingham Open Doubles draw

Nottingham Open
2002 ATP Tour